Bannerton may refer to
Bannerton, Victoria, a locality in north-western Victoria, Australia
Bannerton Solar Park, a solar power station in the locality